Pritzel is a German-language surname. Notable people with the surname include: 

 Ernst Georg Pritzel (1875–1946), German botanist
 Georg August Pritzel (1815–1874), German librarian and botanical writer
 Lotte Pritzel (1887–1952), German costume designer and doll maker

See also
 Pritzelago alpina otherwise Hornungia alpina
 Pritzelia otherwise Trachymene
 Pritzel's feather flower otherwise Verticordia pritzelii
 Hakea pritzelii

German-language surnames